Luis Gustavo Cetin or simply Luis Cetin (born August 5, 1987 in Limeira), is a goalkeeper who is of Turkish descent. He currently plays for Boa.

Contract
1 September 2007 to 31 December 2010

External links
 sambafoot
 zerozero.pt
 CBF
 Guardian Stats Centre
 Conhecendo a prata-da-casa
 fluminense.com

1987 births
Living people
Brazilian people of Turkish descent
Brazilian footballers
Fluminense FC players
America Football Club (RJ) players
Vila Nova Futebol Clube players
Ceará Sporting Club players
Association football goalkeepers
People from Limeira
Footballers from São Paulo (state)